The harlequin beetle (Acrocinus longimanus) is a tropical longhorn beetle native from southern Mexico to Uruguay. The harlequin beetle feeds on sap and is given this name because of its elaborate pattern of black, red and greenish yellow markings on the wing covers of both sexes. The species name longimanus is a Latin word that refers to the extremely long forelegs (manus) of the males, which are usually longer than the beetle’s entire body. As an adult, the species is very large, with a body that can measure nearly 76 mm (3 inches) in length. It is also famous for carrying pseudoscorpions as a form of phoresy.

The harlequin beetle exhibits sexually dimorphic traits.  The foreleg length, measured as the combined length of the femur and tibia, exhibits a greater degree of allometry with increasing elytral length in males than in females.  Large males may also exhibit strong curvature in their foreleg tibiae, which is not seen in females.  These traits aid the males as they fight with each other over optimal egg deposition sites in preparation for mating.  Males engage each other with their forelimbs in an attempt to flip other males off of the dead or dying trees that will be chosen by females to provide food for developing larvae.

The harlequin beetle contains three homologous peptides, Alo-1, Alo-2, and Alo-3. Alo-3 was the first known peptide from insects to exhibit the knottin fold.  It has a higher level of activity against the fungal species Candida glabrata than the Alo-1 and Alo-2 peptides do. Currently, there is a lack of treatment for fatal hospital-acquired infections and other pathologies. The peptide Alo-3 found in Harlequin beetles could provide a treatment for these severe, life threatening infections.

References

Further reading

External links 

Beetles described in 1758
Beetles of South America
Lamiinae
Taxa named by Carl Linnaeus